is a former professional baseball player from Japan. He played for the Fukuoka Daiei Hawks, the Fukuoka SoftBank Hawks, and the Orix Buffaloes of the Japan Pacific League.

References

1978 births
Living people
Baseball people from Ōita Prefecture
Aoyama Gakuin University alumni
Japanese baseball players
Nippon Professional Baseball outfielders
Fukuoka Daiei Hawks players
Fukuoka SoftBank Hawks players
Orix Buffaloes players
Asian Games medalists in baseball
Baseball players at the 2002 Asian Games
Asian Games bronze medalists for Japan
Medalists at the 2002 Asian Games